Otto Schweizer (9 November 1924 – 3 March 2022) was a German footballer who spent 14 years as a player with Bayern Munich, ten with the first team, for whom he also served as captain. Schweizer played as a striker.

Schweizer was an honorary member of Bayern Munich's council from 2004 to 2016. Schweizer was later honoured with Bayern Munich's "number 1" club membership in 2018. Schweizer died in March 2022, at the age of 97. At the time of his death, he had an 83-year association with the club.

References

1924 births
2022 deaths
German footballers
Association football forwards
FC Bayern Munich footballers
FC Bayern Munich non-playing staff
Footballers from Munich